Fibrinogen gamma chain, also known as fibrinogen gamma gene (FGG), is a human gene found on chromosome 4.

The protein encoded by this gene is the gamma component of fibrinogen, a blood-borne glycoprotein composed of three pairs of nonidentical polypeptide chains. Following vascular injury, fibrinogen is cleaved by thrombin to form fibrin which is the most abundant component of blood clots. In addition, various cleavage products of fibrinogen and fibrin regulate cell adhesion and spreading, display vasoconstrictor and chemotactic activities, and are mitogens for several cell types. Mutations in this gene lead to several disorders, including dysfibrinogenemia, hypofibrinogenemia and thrombophilia. Alternative splicing of the mRNA chain results in two transcript variants; the common γA chain and the alternatively spliced γ' chain. Approximately 10% of the total plasma fibrinogen consists of γA/γ' fibrinogen, with <1% consisting of γ'/γ' fibrinogen. Increased and decreased levels of γA/γ' fibrinogen have been associated with coronary artery disease and deep vein thrombosis respectively. 
In the lung parenchyma of smokers, upregulation of FGG transcript levels has been reported.

References

Further reading